Julie Anne McBride (born September 24, 1982 in Troy, New York) is an American-Polish professional basketball coach for the Albany Patroons.

College

McBride graduated Syracuse as the school’s all-time leader in points (1,605), scoring average (14.2 ppg), field goal attempts (1,378), 3-pointers (229), 3-point field goal attempts (707), free throws (348), assists (574), assists average (5.1 apg) and minutes played (3,964). She was a three-time All-Big East selection.

When CNNSI.com released a poll of the top 10 athletes all-time at Syracuse, McBride was the only female athlete on the list at No. 9 – one slot ahead of future NFL Hall of Fame receiver Marvin Harrison.

Syracuse  statistics
Source

Professional career

Following college, McBride played for the San Jose Spiders of the National Women's Basketball League in 2005 and 2006. She averaged 17.7 points per game in 2005 and 8.8 points in the 2006 season.

On May 3, 2006, McBride signed a contract with the Chicago Sky of the WNBA. She was waived on May 13.

Following her brief stint in the WNBA, McBride went overseas to play for Ceyhan's (pronounced J-Han) Spor Club, a pro team in the Turkish Women's Basketball League. In the 2006–07 season, McBride led her league in scoring (19.4 points per game) and assists (6.1). However, Ceyhan finished the season 1–7 after McBride suffered a season-ending injury, tearing her anterior cruciate ligament. Following the 2006–07 season, McBride signed a two-year extension.

Earlier she was a member of the Kayseri Pan Kup Basketball team after leading Samsun Basketbol Kulübü (SBK) in the Turkish Women's Basketball League to the 2nd place and leading her team in scoring (15.0) and assist (4.0). McBride is also a former college basketball player for the Syracuse Orange who was a three-time All Big East selection.

Coaching career
On December 7, 2021, Will Brown announced that Julie McBride would join his coaching staff for the 2022 season.

References

External links
1. WNBA.com Profile

2. Eurobasket Profile

3.  CAMP MCBRIDE- basketball camp Julie provides for kids in her hometown

1982 births
Living people
American expatriate basketball people in Poland
American women's basketball players
Polish women's basketball players
Naturalized citizens of Poland
Shooting guards
Sportspeople from Troy, New York
Syracuse Orange women's basketball players